Tripteridia novella is a moth in the family Geometridae. It is found in New Guinea.

References

Moths described in 1903
Tripteridia